1 Up Top Ahk is the debut studio album by American rapper Mozzy from Sacramento, California. It was released on August 17, 2017, via Mozzy Records and Empire Distribution. Production was mostly handled by Juneonnabeat and David "DaveO" Grear, along with Jay Nari, Murda Beatz, Jay P Bangz, A Dot the God, MB13 Beatz, and Daniel Cruz Beatz. It features guest appearances from June, Bobby Luv, Boosie Badazz, Celly Ru, Dave East, DCMBR, E Mozzy, Kolyon, Lex Aura, Lil Durk, Rexx Life Raj, The Jacka and YFN Lucci. The album peaked at number 68 on the Billboard 200.

Rolling Stone magazine ranked the album on 31st position of their 40 best rap albums of 2017.

Track listing

Charts

References

External links

2017 albums
Mozzy albums
Albums produced by Murda Beatz
Empire Distribution albums